Servitor may be used in the following contexts:

Servitor, an Oxford University undergraduate student who received free accommodation
Servitor, a uniformed porter at the University of Edinburgh
Servitors, menial cyborg labourers in the Warhammer 40,000 universe
 Servitor (chaos magic), a concept within chaos magic
Imar the Servitor, a 1914 American silent film
The Knights Servitors, part of an ancient order of knighthood for priests
Veterans of the Irish Nine Years' War